M. Witmark & Sons was a leading publisher of sheet music for the United States "Tin Pan Alley" music industry.

The firm of Marcus Witmark & Sons was established in New York City in 1886. The father, Marcus Witmark, was the legal head of the company; but from the beginning it was run by his sons Isidore, Julius, and Jay, who were under legal age when the company started (ranging in age from 17 to 14 years old). They started out publishing their own compositions. They were adept at plugging songs, and within a few years were publishing the works of such composers as Victor Herbert, George M. Cohan, Ben Harney, Pauline B. Story, and John Walter Bratton. 

Witmark originated the practice of giving free "professional copies" of their new music to famous and established singers and bands, which proved so successful an advertising method that it was copied by the rest of the music publishers.

When the International Copyright Law was passed in 1891, Witmark pioneered publishing versions of British music in the United States and arranging for American hits to be published in the UK.

Family

Succession of ownership 
Tams-Witmark
 In 1922, Sargent Aborn (1867–1956), brother of Milton Aborn (1864–1933), both of the Aborn Opera Company, acquired the Arthur W. Tams (1848–1927) music library, a collection that had become the largest circulating music library in the world — and by extension, Witmark's biggest competitor in the music-rental field.  In January of 1925, M. Witmark & Sons acquired the music Tams library, ending 30 years of intense rivalry.  The combined Tams-Witmark library, operating as the Tam-Witmark Music Library Inc. (a New York corporation) secured its position as the largest source of musical-comedy and operatic music for amateur and professional productions. Sargent Aborn was president of Tams-Witmark from its founding until his death in 1957.  In 1942, Sargent Aborn and his son, Louis Henry Aborn (1912–2005), acquired the rights to the Tams Library.  As of 2014, the co-chairmen were Robert Aborn Hut (born 1935) and Sargent Louis Aborn (born 1948) and the executive vice-president was Peter Aborn Hut (born 1940). All three are grandchildren of Sargent Aborn.  Tams-Witmark was acquired by Concord in 2018.

 In the 1960s, Tams-Witmark donated several lots of its old inventory to the special collections of five libraries known for music research: the Library of Congress, the Eastman School of Music, Westminster Choir College, and the largest part of its inventory to the University of Wisconsin–Madison, through the initiative of the Wisconsin Center for Film and Theater Research and the School of Music.

 The consolidation of Tams and Witmark mostly affected operatic music and musical theatre.  It did not affect the separate concern of M. Witmark & Sons, music publishers, who continued publishing popular and classical music.

Warner Bros.
 In 1929, M. Witmark was purchased by Warner Bros. Warner Bros. merged its music publishing companies (which included Witmark, Remick, and Harms) into one company, Warner Bros. Music (now Warner/Chappell Music).

Alfred Music
 In 2005, Alfred Music purchased Warner Bros. Publications — acquiring the publishing rights to Warner/Chappell Music and the EMI Music Publishing Catalogue Partnership. Through this deal, Alfred Music gained the print rights of publishers that include M. Witmark & Sons, Remick Music Corp., and T.B. Harms, Inc. Among the EMI holdings are the Robbins and Leo Feist catalogs, plus film music from United Artists, MGM, and 20th Century Fox.

See also 
 American popular music
 Tams-Witmark

Competitor music publishing firms in Tin Pan Alley
 Leo Feist, Inc. – 231 W 40th St, New York, NY
 T.B. Harms & Francis, Day & Hunter, Inc. – 62 W. 45th St., New York, NY
 Shapiro, Bernstein & Co., Inc. – 218 W. 47th St., New York, NY
 Watterson, Berlin & Snyder, Inc. – 1571 Broadway, New York, NY (sold in bankruptcy to Mills Music in 1929)

References

External links

 Mills Music Library Special Collections, Tams-Witmark / Wisconsin Collection
 Pro Culture Editions Tin Pan Alley Publishing House

Witmark
Companies based in New York City
Publishing companies established in 1886